Ebrahimi or Ibrahimi may refer to:
 Ebrahimi, Hormozgan
 Ebrahimi, Khuzestan
 Ebrahimi, Razavi Khorasan
 Ebrahimi, South Khorasan